Yuki Saito (born September 10, 1966 in Minami-ku, Yokohama, Kanagawa Prefecture) is a Japanese actress, singer and narrator.  She attended Kanagawa Prefectural Shimizugaoka High School (now Yokohama Seiryo Sogo High School).

She is well known in Japan for being a member of LDS Church, as she refuses to work on Sundays. Saito used a fake cigarette while filming the 1986 film Koisuru Onnatachi due to her beliefs.

In 1985, after making her singing debut with her single Sotsugyō and her debut album, Axia, she was cast in the lead role of Saki Asamiya in the first Sukeban Deka television drama series. She later revisited that story by playing Saki's mother in the 2006 movie, Sukeban Deka: Codename = Asamiya Saki. She has starred in and been cast in many television and film dramas and comedies, and has also done voice-over narration work.

Saito has released 21 singles and 13 original albums. She has also released a live album, eight "best of" compilation albums, and has been featured on five tribute albums where she covered songs by The Carpenters, songs from Walt Disney films, and others.

Her father owns an obi shop in Yokohama, and her brother is the actor Ryūji Saitō.

Career
While attending high school in 1984, Saito won the third annual "Miss Magazine" Grand Prix contest run by Kodansha in Weekly Shōnen Magazine. She made her singing debut in 1985 with her single release Sotsugyō and her debut album, Axia. That same year, Saito took the leading role in Sukeban Deka, a TV series following the exploits of Saki Asamiya, a high school delinquent who is pressed into service as a yo-yo-wielding undercover police officer sent to a high school known for its vicious gangs.

Saito was selected to play the heroine in the NHK morning TV novel series Hanekonma in 1986. This series garnered a rating of 41.7% for its timeslot.  At the end of the year, she was the captain of the Red Team on Kōhaku Uta Gassen, where she debuted her song, Kanashimi yo Konnichi wa, the first opening theme for the anime television series Maison Ikkoku. This song became one of the most popular anime theme songs of all time.

She was captain of the red team again in 1989, where her single  was ranked fifth in the competition. She would later, in 2007, perform both the opening and ending theme songs for another anime series, Les Misérables: Shōjo Cosette, an adaptation of Victor Hugo's classic novel by Nippon Animation for their World Masterpiece Theater series. Saitō had earlier played the title character, Cosette, in its 1987 musical stage version.

She wrote a commentary on Yasutaka Tsutsui's work Kyakusō Gijitsu in 1989. Saito married salaryman Nobuyasu Isarai in 1994, and they have one son and two daughters. While she still occasionally takes acting roles, she spends most of her time with her family. During the 1990s, Saito began moving from the role of idol star to doing more acting in movies, television, and on stage. She also began writing poetry, doing voice-over narration, and song and lyric writing.

Saito has a wide range of roles, from serious to comedic. Throughout the 1990s, most of her roles on stage, TV, and film were serious, dramatic roles. In 2006, she returned to her comedy roots with a role in Wagahai wa Shufu Dearu.  Along with Mitsuhiro Oikawa, she formed a duo called  in 2006 and released , and made her first singing appearance in seven years on June 8, 2006. This year also marked the 17th year since her appearance on the Takaaki Ishibashi owarai show Tonwarazu no Mina-san no Okage Desu.  In the 2006 movie, Sukeban Deka: Codename = Asamiya Saki (a.k.a. Yo-Yo Girl Cop), Saito plays Saki's mother. She held several 25th anniversary concerts in February 2011.

Personal life
Saito is well known in Japan for being a member of the Church of Jesus Christ of Latter-day Saints, as she refuses to work on Sundays. In the 1986 film Koisuru Onnatachi, Saito used a fake cigarette used for asthma patients due to her LDS beliefs, which forbid the use of tobacco, including smoking.

Saito's father owns a long-standing and respected obi tailoring shop in Yokohama, and sells his obis to multiple kimono stores in Motomachi, Tobe, and other places within the city. Her brother is the actor Ryūji Saitō. Saito's hobbies include poetry, illustrating, and writing books.

Albums

Filmography

TV dramas
{|class="wikitable sortable"
! Title !! Year !! Network !! Role
|-
| Yakyū-kyō no Uta || 1985 || Fuji TV || Yūki Mizuhara
|-
| Sukeban Deka || 1985 || Fuji TV || Saki Asamiya
|-
| Pappa kara no Okurimono || 1985 || NHK ||
|-
| Hane Konma || 1986 || NHK || Orin
|-
| Amae Naide yo! || 1987 || Fuji TV ||
|-
| Totte Oki no Seishun || 1988 || NHK ||
|-
| Asobi ni Oide yo! || 1988 || Fuji TV ||
|-
| High School Rakugaki || 1989 || TBS || Izumi Suwa
|-
| Shōnan Monogatari || 1989 || NTV ||
|-
| Lucky Tenshi, Miyako e Iku || 1989 || Fuji TV ||
|-
| High School Rakugaki 2 || 1990 || TBS || Izumi Suwa
|-
| Yo ni mo Kimyō na Monogatari "Zettai Iya!" || 1990 || Fuji TV ||
|-
| Kazunomiya-sama O-Tome || 1991 || TV Asahi
|-
| Onna Jiken Kisha Tachibana Keiko || 1992 || TV Asahi
|-
| Mattanashi! || 1992 || NTV ||
|-
| If: Moshimo "Kanojo ga Suwaru no wa, Migi no Isu ka? Hidari no Isu ka?" || 1993 || Fuji TV
|-
| Dōsōkai || 1993 || NTV ||
|-
| Fukui-sanchi no Isan Sōzoku || 1994 || Kansai TV ||
|-
| Yo ni mo Kimyō na Monogatari "Derarenai" || 1994 || Fuji TV ||
|-
| Hachidai Shōgun Yoshimune || 1995 || NHK || Tokugawa Tsunayoshi's daughter Princess Tsuru
|-
| Kimi wo Omou yori Kimi ni Aitai || 1995 || Kansai TV ||
|-
| Bōryoku Kyōshi: Kimi ni Tsutaetai Koto || 1996 || NHK ||
|-
| Eien no Atom: Tezuka Osamu Monogatari || 1999 || TV Tokyo || Yumiko Igarashi
|-
| Wakaretara Suki na Hito || 1999 || TV Tokyo ||
|-
| Aru Hi, Arashi no yō ni || 2001 || NHK ||
|-
| Kindaichi Kōsuke Series "Jinmensō" || 2003 || TBS ||
|-
| Onna no Ichidaiki: Jakucho Setouchi || 2005 || Fuji TV || Tsuya Setouchi (Jakucho's older sister)
|-
| Wagahai wa Shufu Dearu || 2006 || TBS || Midori Yana
|-
| O Banzai! || 2007 || TBS/MBS || Kurumi Hanazono
|-
| Utahime || 2007 || TBS || Seiko Matsujima
|-
| Battery || 2008 || NHK || Makiko Harada
|-
| Shōkōjo Seira || 2009 || TBS || Emiko Mimura
|-
| The Ancient Dogoo Girl || 2009 || MBS || Sayuri Sugihara
|-
| Dōsōkai: Love Again Shōkōgun || 2010 || TV Asahi || Yōko Nishikawa
|-
| Sotsugyō Homerun || 2011 || TV Tokyo || Sayuri Inoue
|-
| Saigo no Bansan: Keiji Tōno Kazuyuki to Shichinin no Yōgisha || 2011 || TV Asahi || Natsumi Tōno
|-
| Hi ha Mata Noboru || 2011 || TV Asahi || Natsumi Tōno
|-
| Ohisama || 2011 || Fuji TV || Fusako Haraguchi
|-
| Lessons || 2011 || Kansai TV || Kanako Kurosawa
|-
| Keisatsui Akizuki Kei no Kenshi File || 2012 || Fuji TV || Kei Akizuki
|-
| Koi Aji Oyako || 2012 || TV Asahi || Sawako Nishiyama
|-
| Ashita o Akiramenai...Gareki no Naka no Shinbunsha: Kahoku Shinpō no Ichiban Nagai Hi || 2012 || TV Tokyo || Yuriko Nakajima
|-
| Naniwa Shōnen Tanteidan || 2012 || TBS || Hideko Harada
|-
| Iryū Sōsa || 2012 || TV Asahi || Kyōko Mizusawa
|-
| Gomen ne Seishun! || 2014 || TBS || Yoshie Yoshii
|-
| Sanada Maru || 2016 || NHK || Acha no Tsubone
|-
| Keishichō Sōsaikkachō Season 1 || 2016 || TV Asahi || Hirai Makoto
|-
| Okaasan, Musume wo Yamete Ii Desuka? || 2017 || NHK || Hayase Akiko
|-
| Keishichō Sōsaikkachō Season 2 || 2017 || TV Asahi || Hirai Makoto
|-
| Kuroido Goroshi || 2018 || Fuji TV || Kana Shiba
|-
| Miss Sherlock || 2018 || HBO Asia || Mariko Irikawa
|-
| Scandal Senmon Bengoshi QUEEN'''' || 2019 || Fuji TV || Mano Seiko
|-
| Schöner, Ruhiger Garten || 2019 || NHK || Midori Asagiri
|-
| The Yagyu Conspiracy || 2020 || NHK || Oeyo
|-
| Keishichō Sōsaikkachō Season 2020 || 2020 || TV Asahi || Hirai Makoto
|-
| Kikenna Venus || 2020 || TBS || Yagami Sadako
|-
| Keishichō Sōsaikkachō Season 5 || 2021 || TV Asahi || Hirai Makoto
|-
| Kotodamasō || 2021 || TV Asahi || Iwato Shima
|-
| Youtuber ni Musume wa Yaran || 2022 || TV Tokyo || Mieko Taira
|-
| Keishichō Sōsaikkachō Season 6 || 2022 || TV Asahi || Hirai Makoto
|-
| Koi Nante, Honki de Yatte Dousuruno? || 2022 || Kansai TV || Nagamine Mayumi
|-
| Ōoku: The Inner Chambers || 2023 || NHK || Lady Kasuga
|-
|}

Films

Dubbing

TheatreLes Misérables  (1987) (Cosette)Kara Sawagi (1990)5-ji no Koibito (1992)Nijūyon no Hitomi (1994)Kimi to Naru: Nobody Else But You (1995)Ningen Kazaguruma (2000)Sora no Kaa-sama (2001)Friends (2001)Nikui Anchi Kushō (2002) (Kosode)Claudia kara no Tegami (2006)Zebra (2009)Saitō Sachiko (2009)Kiseki no Melody: Watanabe Hamako Monogatari (2010)Our Town'' (2011)

References

External links
 Official agency profile 
 
 

 
1966 births
Living people
Actresses from Yokohama
Japanese idols
Japanese women pop singers
Japanese Latter Day Saints
Pony Canyon artists
Musicians from Kanagawa Prefecture
Asadora lead actors
20th-century Japanese actresses
21st-century Japanese actresses
20th-century Japanese women singers
20th-century Japanese singers
21st-century Japanese women singers
21st-century Japanese singers